Danielle Bennett is a Canadian author. Her most prominent work is the 2008 fantasy novel Havemercy, co-written with Jaida Jones. Bennett is from Victoria, British Columbia and attended Vic High (graduated 2004) and Camosun College. She met Jones in a LiveJournal thread and the two started writing a novel together. The resulting novel, Havermercy was picked up Random House for an advance of $30,000 and published in 2008.

In March 2019, Jones and Bennett announced they had sold another book, Master of One, which is a young adult (YA) fantasy forthcoming from HarperTeen in Fall 2020.

Bibliography

The Volstovic Cycle
 Havemercy (2008, Spectra)
 Shadow Magic (2009, Spectra)
 Dragon Soul (2010, Spectra)
 Steelhands (2011, Spectra)

Other novels
 Master of One (2020, HarperTeen)

References

External links
 
 

Canadian fantasy writers
Living people
Writers from Victoria, British Columbia
Year of birth missing (living people)